Mezwed is a genre of popular traditional music based on North African Amazigh scale rhythms. It incorporates traditional Tunisian drums called Darbouka and a kind of bagpipe called a mizwad with a bag made from ewe's leather. Usually it is sung in Tunisian linguistic varieties. Originally the music of the countryside and the working classes; it is often played at weddings and parties.

The themes of Mezwed are social, family and love. Nowadays new fusions of Mezwed, with Hip-Hop and Rap are becoming popular. Some of the most popular singers include Fatma Boussaha, Samir Loussif, and Hedi Habbouba.

Artists 
Hichem Lekhdhiri
Fathi Weld Fajra
Fatma Boussaha
Hedi Habbouba
Samir Loussif
Saleh El Farzit
Lotfi Jormana

External links 
 Exposé du Musée des civilisations de l'Europe et de la Méditerranée
 Exposé du Musée virtuel du Canada

Tunisian music